The legal status of female genital mutilation (FGM), also known as female genital cutting (FGC), differs widely across the world.

Overview of issues

Geographic perspective 

In international law, there is a consensus that female genital mutilation is a human rights violation that needs to be criminalised and eradicated by all states. International human rights instruments to that effect include global and regional treaties, conventions, protocols, declarations, resolutions and recommendations such as CEDAW Committee General Recommendation No. 14 (1990), Maputo Protocol Article 5 (2003), the Cairo Declaration on the Elimination of FGM (CDEFGM, 2003), Istanbul Convention Article 38 (2011), Sustainable Development Goal 5.3 (2015), the East African Community Prohibition of Female Genital Mutilation Act (EAC Act, 2016) and United Nations Human Rights Council Resolution No. 38/61 (2018).

Global efforts to end FGM, including criminalisation, have long focused on Africa, where most countries that have traditionally practiced FGM are located and anti-FGM campaigns have been quite successful in the 1990s through 2010s, but have long under-appreciated traditionally FGM-practicing countries in Asia and immigrant communities in countries with no FGM tradition. A March 2020 report by End FGM European Network, U.S. End FGM/C Network and Equality Now found that FGM was practiced in at least 92 countries across all continents, while 51 of them had a law that specifically criminalised FGM.

FGM was illegal in 22 of the 28 most FGM-prevalent countries in Africa in September 2018. Sudan criminalised FGM in April 2020.

Some Western countries, where FGM has not been traditionally practiced but where immigrants from traditionally FGM-practicing countries have moved to in the 20th and 21st century, have also criminalised FGM (13 countries as of November 2008). By 2013, FGM had been criminalised in all 27 member states of the European Union (including the United Kingdom) and Croatia.

Despite international reports to the contrary, female genital mutilation has been explicitly criminalised in the Netherlands since 1 February 2006, namely in the then Articles 5.3 and 5a.1 of the Dutch Criminal Code (Wetboek van Strafrecht), and the statute of limitations was increased on 1 July 2009 by not starting until the day after the FGM victim's 18th birthday. As of 25 July 2020, genital mutilation of female persons under age 18 is punishable in the Netherlands, including when committed abroad by Dutch citizens, foreigners who later obtain Dutch citizenship or foreigners with a regular place of residence or stay in the Netherlands, as a form of (aggravated) assault (potentially premeditated) under Articles 300 to 303 per Article 7.d and Article 71.3 of the Dutch Criminal Code. The maximum punishment is 12 years imprisonment (or 15 years if the victim dies). The penalty can be increased by a third if the perpetrator(s) were (a) family member(s) or the life companion of the victim (Article 304.1) or if the victim was underage (Article 304.2).

In the United States, FGM was criminalised federally in 1996 and in 17/50 states during 1994–2006. However, the federal law criminalising FGM was declared unconstitutional by a Michigan court in November 2018, mostly because the judge found that the federal government did not have the authority to legislate on the issue, and that the U.S. states should. At the time of the ruling, 27 states had specifically criminalised FGM, and the court case stimulated the other states to do so as well, both during and after the trial. By March 2020, the practice was illegal in 35/50 states; by May 2020, FGM was banned in 38/50 U.S. states. On 5 January 2021, the STOP FGM Act of 2020 was enacted, which considers FGM 'a form of child abuse, gender discrimination, and violence', empowering federal authorities to prosecute people who 'carry out or conspire to carry out FGM' and increasing the maximum prison sentence from 5 to 10 years. This replaced the 1996 law that was declared unconstitutional in 2018. At the time of signing, 11 out of the 50 U.S. states still had no state ban on FGM.

Legal methods 
The way in which legislation (and usually criminalisation) of FGM is enacted, differs from country to country. Some countries' constitutions ban FGM, others have adopted specific laws criminalising FGM, others have subsumed prohibitions on FGM in wider criminal legislation on either child protection, violence against women, sexual violence, or physical assault. In EU member states, there is a trend to criminalise FGM in specific rather than general criminal law provisions; by 2013, 10 states of 28 (including Croatia and the UK) had done so. By March 2020, Estonia, Germany, Malta and Portugal had also introduced explicit provisions criminalising FGM, so that 14 out of the current 27 EU Member States have specific anti-FGM legislation.

Indian Minister for Women and Child Development Maneka Gandhi said in 2017 that the 1860 Indian Penal Code, the 1973 Criminal Procedure Code and the 2012 Protection of Children from Sexual Offences Act (POCSO Act) could be invoked to prosecute FGM cases and that a specific law to criminalise FGM was not necessary.

Cross-border FGM and extraterritoriality 
Sometimes FGM is performed across the border in a country where it is still legal in order to avoid prosecution in one's country of residence (for example, in Mali by Burkina Faso residents or in Somalia by Kenya residents). As of September 2018, Guinea Bissau, Kenya and Uganda were the only countries in Africa that criminalised and punished cross-border FGM. In the European Union, legislators have applied the legal principle of extraterritoriality to prosecute the practice of FGM when it is committed outside of a member state's territory to girls living in the EU who had been cut or are at risk of being cut in their or their parents' country of birth while on holidays or visits abroad.

Laws by country

See also 
 Prevalence of female genital mutilation
 Religious views on female genital mutilation
 Sexual consent in law

Notes

References

External links 
 Female genital mutilation/cutting: a call for a global response – March 2020 report by End FGM European Network, U.S. End FGM/C Network and Equality Now

Criminal law by country